Précy-sur-Marne (literally Précy on Marne) is a commune in the Seine-et-Marne department in the Île-de-France region in north-central France.

Demographics
The inhabitants are called  Précyens.

People
 Barbara, a French singer, had a house in the village, and had dedicated a song to it (Précy jardin)
 Yves Duteil, singer-songwriter, mayor of Précy-sur-Marne between 1989 and 2014.

See also
Communes of the Seine-et-Marne department

References

External links

1999 Land Use, from IAURIF (Institute for Urban Planning and Development of the Paris-Île-de-France région) 

Communes of Seine-et-Marne